Šiukštuliškiai (historically) is a village in Kėdainiai district municipality, in Kaunas County, in central Lithuania. It is located by the Smilga and Smilgaitis rivers, nearby Josvainiai forest. According to the 2011 census, the village has a population of 3 people.

Demography

References

Villages in Kaunas County
Kėdainiai District Municipality